Saife Hasan is a Pakistani TV director and actor. He is best known for the drama serial Dil ki Madham Boliyan (2005) and Ehd-e-Wafa (2019). He has directed the drama serial Bari Aapa for which he was nominated for the Hum Award for Best Director Drama Serial at 1st Hum Awards ceremony and Ru Baru.

Career 
Hassan has worked as a director for more than ten years at Hum TV, and since 2003 has directed television ventures for television channels.

Filmography

Following are the list of dramas serials which he directed and acted:

 Chal Chala Chal
 Fair & Lovely: Qismat Kay Sitaray
 Dil ki Madham Boliyan
 Tum Mere Ho
 Ek Pagal Si Larki
 Dil-e-Abad
 Mar Jain Bhi To Kya 
 Ru Baru
 Shahrukh Khan Ki Maut (2005) 
 Insha'Allah (2009)
 Bari Aapa (2012)
 Aseerzadi (2013)
 Tum Mere Pass Raho
 Double Trouble 
 Uff Meri Family
 Dil Ka Kia Rung Karun
 Yeh Shaadi Nahi Hosakhti 
 Dil Nahi Manta 
 Shan-e-Iftar 
 Dil Nae Manta
 Khatti Meethi Zindagi
 Tum Mere Paas Raho
 Ishq-e-Benaam
 Main Hoon Shahid Afridi 
 Actor in Law (2016)
 Jeewan Hathi (2016)
 Aap Ke Liye (2016)
 Bharosa Pyar Tera (2019)
 Superstar (2019)
 Pyar Kahani (2019)
 Ehd-e-Wafa (2019)
 Alif (2019)
 Senti Aur Mental (2020)
 Sang-e-Mah (2022)
 Parde Mein Rehne Do (2022)
 Dum Mastam (2022)
 Paristan
 Mushkil 2022

Awards and nominations

References

External links
 Saife Hassan Official Website
 

1969 births
Living people
People from Karachi
Pakistani male television actors
Pakistani television directors